Hanshäger Bach is a river of Mecklenburg-Vorpommern, Germany. It flows into the Ziese near Kemnitz.

See also
List of rivers of Mecklenburg-Vorpommern

Rivers of Mecklenburg-Western Pomerania
Natural monuments in Mecklenburg-Western Pomerania
Rivers of Germany